The Eastern Zone was one of the three regional zones of the 1965 Davis Cup.

9 teams entered the Eastern Zone, competing across 2 sub-zones. The winner of each sub-zone would play against each other to determine who would compete in the Inter-Zonal Zone against the winners of the America Zone and Europe Zone.

Japan defeated South Korea in the Zone A final, and India defeated South Vietnam in the Zone B final. In the Inter-Zonal final India defeated Japan and progressed to the Inter-Zonal Zone.

Zone A

Draw

Semifinals

Japan vs. Philippines

Final

South Korea vs. Japan

Zone B

Draw

Quarterfinals

Iran vs. India

Pakistan vs. South Vietnam

Semifinals

Ceylon vs. India

South Vietnam vs. Malaysia

Final

India vs. South Vietnam

Eastern Inter-Zonal Final

Japan vs. India

References

External links
Davis Cup official website

Davis Cup Asia/Oceania Zone
Eastern Zone
Davis Cup